Başaklı can refer to:

 Başaklı, Çınar
 Başaklı, Oltu